Samuel Hirszenberg (also Schmul Hirschenberg) (Łódź, February 22, 1865 – September 15, 1908, Jerusalem) was a Polish-Jewish realist and later symbolist painter active in the late 19th and early 20th century.

Biography
Szmul (Samuel) Hirszenberg was born in 1865, the eldest son of a weaving mill worker in Polish Łódź. Against the will of his father, but thanks to the financial assistance of a doctor, he chose to be an artist. At the age of 15 he began his studies at the Academy of Fine Arts in Kraków, where he was heavily influenced by the realistic painting of Jan Matejko.

After two years of training in Kraków, he continued his studies from 1885-1889 at the Royal Academy of Arts in Munich.

Art career
 
His first major work to attract attention was Yeshiva (1887). After an exhibition at the Kunstverein Munich (1889), he showed at the art exhibition in Paris and was awarded a silver medal. In Paris, he completed his artistic training at the Académie Colarossi.

In 1891, Hirszenberg returned to Poland. In 1893 he resettled in his hometown of Łódź. While the images of the early years, like the paintings Talmudic Studies, Sabbathnachmittag, Uriel Acosta, and The Jewish cemetery show a certain kinship with the Jewish genre painting by Leopold Horowitz, Isidor Kaufmann, and Maurycy Gottlieb, his later works can be rather assigned to the symbolism. Themes of the "tearful" Jewish history came to the fore. Noteworthy are the three most famous pictures of this period: The Wandering Jew (1899), Exile (1904), and Czarny Sztandar / Black Flag (1905).

In 1900, after working on a large painting, "The Eternal Jew," for over four years, it  was exhibited in the Paris Salon. Disappointed by the poor response in Paris  Munich and Berlin, he retired for health reasons.

In 1901, he went for a year on a trip to Italy. In 1904, Hirszenberg moved to Kraków. In 1907, he immigrated to Israel and began to work as a lecturer at the newly founded Bezalel School in Jerusalem, headed by Boris Schatz. After a short and intense creative period, he died in 1908 in Jerusalem.

Selected paintings

See also 
Israeli art
 Maurycy Trębacz (1861–1941), Polish-Jewish painter.

References

Further reading
 Cohen, Richard I. (1998). Jewish icons: art and society in modern Europe. Berkeley: University of California Press. . P. 223-235.
 Goodman, Susan Tumarkin (2001). The Emergence of Jewish Artists in Nineteenth-Century Europe. London; New York: Merrell. .
 Ruth (1902). "Samuel Hirszenberg: eine biographische Skizze" [biographical sketch, in German]. In: East and West, vol. 2, issue 10. Columns 673-688. 
 "Samuel Hirszenberg" in Jewish Encyclopedia, 1906.
 Schwarz, Karl (1949). Jewish Artists of the 19th and 20th Centuries. New York: Philosophical Library, 1949. P. 43-49.

External links 

 Hirszenberg's works in Central Jewish Library
An artwork by Samuel Hirszenberg at the Ben Uri site

1865 births
1908 deaths
Artists from Łódź
19th-century Polish Jews
Jewish painters
Jan Matejko Academy of Fine Arts alumni
Academy of Fine Arts, Munich alumni
Académie Colarossi alumni
Academic staff of Bezalel Academy of Arts and Design
19th-century Polish painters
19th-century Polish male artists
Polish male painters